Nick Powell (born 1994) is an English professional footballer.

Nick Powell may also refer to:

Nick Powell (bassist), English musician and songwriter
Nick Powell (musician/composer), British musician, composer and sound designer

See also
Nik Powell (1950–2019), British businessman